This article lists the winners and nominees for the Billboard Music Award for Top Touring Artist. This award has been given out since 2011 and currently U2 hold the record for most wins in this category with three.

Winners and nominees
Winners are listed first and highlighted in bold.

2010s

2020s

Multiple wins and nominations

Wins
3 wins
 U2

Nominations

4 nominations
U2
3 nominations
 Bon Jovi
 Roger Waters
 Lady Gaga
 Bruce Springsteen
 Taylor Swift
 The Rolling Stones
 Ed Sheeran

2 nominations
 Beyoncé
 Bruno Mars
 Coldplay
 Madonna
 One Direction
 Pink

References

Billboard awards